Cristiano Marques Gomes (born 3 June 1977), or simply Cris, is a Brazilian football manager and a former player who is the manager of Championnat National club Le Mans FC. Previously he was manager of GOAL FC, and spent three years as manager of the under-19 squad of Lyon. A former centre-back, Cris is also nicknamed "the policeman" by way of reference to his authoritarian nature on the pitch and his four months of experience in a police department in Guarulhos. He won four consecutive Ligue 1 titles with French club Lyon between 2005 and 2008, as well as the Brazilian Championship in 1998 with Corinthians, and in 2003 with Cruzeiro, and he also won the Copa do Brasil in 1995 with Corinthians, and in 2000 with Cruzeiro. Cris represented Brazil at international level, winning the Copa América in 2004.

Club career

Early career 
Cris spent a three-year spell in São Paulo playing for Corinthians (1995–98) before joining Cruzeiro. There, he won his first cap for the national team, playing on 4 April 1999 against the United States in Brasília (a match won 7–0 by Brazil). In 2000, Brazilian magazine Placar named Cris as the leading player in his position during the Brazilian Championship, awarding him the Silver Ball title. In 2002, he secured a transfer to Europe, moving to Bundesliga club Bayer Leverkusen. This move, however, did not prove successful as he struggled to adapt to his new surroundings both on and off the field. The following year saw him return to his native country, rejoining Cruzeiro as part of their Brazilian championship-winning team of that year.

Lyon
In August 2004, Cris left Brazil once more, this time moving to Lyon for a transfer fee close to €3.5 million. Having been involved in a brawl during a match in June earlier that year, Cris ran the risk of a six-month suspension that the Brazilian Football Confederation eventually decided not to extend to matches outside of Brazil. This affair, along with the physical duel he enjoyed with Thierry Henry during the France–Brazil international at the Stade de France on 20 May 2004, earned Cris the reputation of a rough, rugged defender.

After an unconvincing first spell in Europe, Cris quickly imposed himself at the heart of Lyon's defense. His first season in Ligue 1 saw the club crowned league champions and Cris was selected to the UNFP Ligue 1 Team of the Year. His second season was one of consolidation: Cris again had an excellent season with Lyon leaving no doubt as to his overall class. He was crowned "étoile d'or" ("Gold Star") by France Football magazine. The newspaper L'Equipe considered him the best defender of the 2005–06 season and he was once more voted to the Ligue 1 Team of the Year by his fellow professionals. This season earned him an upwardly revised salary as well as a one-year extension to his contract, tying him to the French club until 2010. Cris later extended his contract an additional year, keeping him at Lyon until 2011.

For the 2007–08 season, newly appointed Lyon manager Alain Perrin appointed Cris as the new captain . On 11 August 2007, Cris was injured in a game between Lyon and Toulouse, tearing ligaments in his right knee during a collision with Johan Elmander. Cris made his return to the squad on 1 March 2008 in a 1–0 win over Lille. The match was held at the Stade de France. On 17 March 2012, Cris suffered a calf injury in a 1–0 derby win over Saint-Étienne that ruled him out for a month.

Galatasaray
On 3 September 2012, after eight years with Lyon, Cris signed for Turkish side Galatasaray for a €1.25 million transfer, plus bonuses, and signed a 1+1-year contract. He scored his first goal for Galatasaray on 28 October 2012 in the Süper Lig match against Kayserispor, a 3–0 home win. On 2 January 2013, after just four months in Turkey, Galatasaray terminated Cris' contract, prompting him to return to his native Brazil where he signed for Grêmio.

Grêmio
On 3 January 2013, one day after breaking his contract with Galatasaray, Cris signed with Brazilian side Grêmio. He arrived at the club as a direct replacement for Gilberto Silva, who had consequently transferred to Atlético Mineiro.

Vasco da Gama
On 31 July 2013, Cris signed with Vasco da Gama. His first match was against Grêmio, a 2–3 loss. Cris was released from the club in January 2014 after his contract was not renewed.

International career
Cris has 17 caps with the Brazil national team, the first earned in July 2001. Cris missed the 2002 World Cup in Korea & Japan due to an ankle sprain injury. He was part of the Brazilian squad that capture their seventh Copa América title back in 2004. He was also rewarded for his magnificent club form on 15 May 2006 by Carlos Alberto Parreira who selected him in the national squad for their 2006 FIFA World Cup campaign in Germany. On 13 November 2009, he was called back into the national squad for friendlies against England on 14 November and Oman on 18 November, despite last appearing with the team on 1 March 2006.

Cris's only goal for Brazil came in a 6–0 friendly victory over Bolivia on 31 January 2002.

Career statistics

Club

International

International goals

Managerial statistics 
As of 3 March 2023

Honours

Club
Corinthians
 Campeonato Brasileiro Série A: 1998
 Copa do Brasil: 1995
 Campeonato Paulista: 1995, 1997, 1999

Cruzeiro
 Campeonato Brasileiro Série A: 2003
 Copa do Brasil: 2000
 Campeonato Mineiro: 2004

Lyon
 Ligue 1: 2004–05, 2005–06, 2006–07, 2007–08
 Coupe de France: 2011–12
 Trophée des Champions: 2005, 2007, 2012

International
Brazil
Copa América: 2004

Individual
Bola de Prata: 2000
Ligue 1 Team of the Year: 2004–05, 2005–06, 2006–07
ESM Team of the Year: 2005–06

References

External links

 

1977 births
Living people
People from Guarulhos
Brazilian footballers
Association football central defenders
Brazil international footballers
2001 Copa América players
2004 Copa América players
2006 FIFA World Cup players
Copa América-winning players
Campeonato Brasileiro Série A players
Bundesliga players
Ligue 1 players
Süper Lig players
Sport Club Corinthians Paulista players
Cruzeiro Esporte Clube players
Bayer 04 Leverkusen players
Olympique Lyonnais players
Galatasaray S.K. footballers
Grêmio Foot-Ball Porto Alegrense players
CR Vasco da Gama players
Brazilian football managers
Brazilian expatriate footballers
Brazilian expatriate football managers
Brazilian expatriate sportspeople in Germany
Expatriate footballers in Germany
Brazilian expatriate sportspeople in France
Expatriate footballers in France
Brazilian expatriate sportspeople in Turkey
Expatriate footballers in Turkey
Le Mans FC managers
Footballers from São Paulo (state)